Marpesia chiron, the many-banded daggerwing, is a species of daggerwings, map butterflies in the family Nymphalidae. It is found in Central America, North America, and South America.

The MONA or Hodges number for Marpesia chiron is 4549.

Subspecies
These two subspecies belong to the species Marpesia chiron:
 Marpesia chiron chiron
 Marpesia chiron insularis Fruhstorfer

References

Further reading

External links

 

Cyrestinae
Articles created by Qbugbot
Butterflies described in 1775
Taxa named by Johan Christian Fabricius